Wrecked: Revenge Revisited (previously known as Gas: Fuel For Fun) is a vehicular combat racing video game developed by Supersonic Software and published by 505 Games for PlayStation Network and Xbox Live Arcade, but the PS3 release is only available in the PAL region.

Reception

Wrecked: Revenge Revisited received "mixed" reviews on both platforms according to the review aggregation website Metacritic.

See also
 Mashed: Drive to Survive

References

External links
Supersonic Software Ltd Gas page

2012 video games
505 Games games
Multiplayer and single-player video games
PlayStation 3 games
PlayStation Network games
Racing video games
Vehicular combat games
Video games developed in the United Kingdom
Xbox 360 games
Xbox 360 Live Arcade games
Supersonic Software games